Luciana Malgeri Pignatelli (13 January 1935 – 13 October 2008) was an Italian socialite who was a social arbiter, spokesmodel for Camay soap, and a jewelry designer.

Background

Born Luciana Malgeri, she was the daughter of journalist Francesco Malgeri and his wife, the Italian-Brazilian Nelida Lenci, previously Countess Crespi (widow of the late Count Dino Crespi). She had two half-brothers, Count Rodolfo Crespi and Marco Fabio Crespi, husband of Vogue editor Consuelo Crespi.

Marriages
On 20 June 1954, Luciana Malgeri married Prince Don Nicolò Maria Pignatelli Aragon Cortès (born 22 May 1923 – 2021), 17th Prince of Noia, a Gulf Oil executive. (The title, one of a string held by the family, derives from the Kingdom of Aragon.) The marriage was annulled in 1968. The couple had two children: Princess Donna Fabrizia (born 30 January 1956), married to Stephen Fiamma; and Prince Don Diego (born 21 May 1958), a managing director of Warburg Dillon Read in Italy, who married Cristina Prandoni Porta.

In 1970, Luciana Pignatelli married Burt Simms Avedon, then the president of Eve of Roma, who is a cousin of the photographer Richard Avedon. By this marriage she had three stepdaughters. They divorced circa 1980.

Books and career 
As Princess Luciana Pignatelli, she was the author of The Beautiful People's Beauty Book (McCall, 1970), which was described as "a straightforward approach to narcissism". As Luciana Avedon, she was the author of The Beautiful People's Diet Book (Bantam, 1973) and Luciana Avedon's Body Book (Henry Holt, 1976). All three books were co-written with Jeanne Molli.

In the 1970s, as Luciana Pignatelli, she became the spokesperson for the soap Camay, appearing in U.S. and international television commercials.

Pignatelli was the European fashion coordinator of Eve of Roma, a cosmetics company.

In her last years, she became a jewelry designer, travelling twice yearly from her home in London to the Bangkok workshops of Rolf von Bueren, a German noble who established Lotus Arts de Vivre, a leading jewelry and objet d’art company in Thailand.

Honors
She was named to the International Best-Dressed List in 1966.

Death
In October 2008, Pignatelli Avedon committed suicide with an overdose of sleeping tablets, after learning her investments were worthless. She reportedly had said, "I can’t face being old and poor."

References

1935 births
2008 suicides
Italian jewellery designers
Italian princesses
Italian socialites
Drug-related suicides in Italy